Angel Olsen (born Angelina Maria Carroll; January 22, 1987) is an American singer-songwriter from St. Louis, Missouri who lives in Asheville, North Carolina.

To date, Olsen has released six studio albums: Half Way Home (2012), Burn Your Fire for No Witness (2014), My Woman (2016), All Mirrors (2019), Whole New Mess (2020), and Big Time (2022).

Early life and education
Angel Olsen was born on January 22, 1987, in St. Louis, Missouri. At age three, Olsen was adopted by a foster family that had cared for her since shortly after her birth. The difference in years between her and her parents left an impression. "Because there are so many decades of difference between us, I became more interested in what their childhood was like," she says of her parents, both of whom died in 2021. "I fantasized about what it was like to be young in the ’30s and ’50s, more so than other kids my age." Olsen explained that "my mother just has this capacity for children."

Despite early adolescent aspirations to be a "pop star", her interests later shifted in high school. Olsen became more introverted, regularly attending punk rock and noise music shows at the Lemp Neighborhood Arts Center and the Creepy Crawl as well as Christian rock shows throughout the city. She began learning the piano and guitar and writing her own music. At the age of 16, she joined a local band called Good Fight, self-described as "a meeting of early No Doubt and punk rock." Two years after graduating from Tower Grove Christian High School, Olsen moved to Chicago.

She befriended country rock singer-songwriter Bonnie “Prince” Billy, who invited her to go on tour as his backing vocalist.

Career

2011–2014: Strange Cacti and Half Way Home

Olsen released her debut EP, Strange Cacti in 2011, and her debut studio album, Half Way Home, in 2012. on Bathetic Records. In addition to her work with Bonnie "Prince" Billy and the Cairo Gang, Olsen has collaborated with a number of other notable figures of American indie rock, including Tim Kinsella of Cap'n Jazz, LeRoy Bach of Wilco and Cass McCombs. Her collaboration with Kinsella and Bach, as well as with Chicago poet Marvin Tate, resulted in the album Tim Kinsella Sings the Songs of Marvin Tate by Leroy Bach Featuring Angel Olsen which the group released on Indianapolis label Joyful Noise Recordings on December 3, 2013.

2014–2017: Burn Your Fire for No Witness and My Woman
Olsen signed a recording contract with Jagjaguwar, ahead of her first full-band record, Burn Your Fire for No Witness, which was released on February 17, 2014. The closing track of the album, "Windows", was featured in the final episode in the first season of the Netflix original series 13 Reasons Why in 2017.

Olsen's third studio album, My Woman, was released on September 2, 2016. In a review for Consequence of Sound, critic Ciara Dolan described the album as a "startling record of unimpeachable strength and honesty", while Pitchforks Jenn Pelly described it as "her best record yet".

2019–2021: All Mirrors, Whole New Mess, and Songs of the Lark and Other Far Memories
Olsen's fourth studio album, All Mirrors, was released on October 4, 2019, to critical acclaim. Laura Snapes of Pitchfork described the album as "breathtaking", and a "strong wind" that blows in and "leaves you undone", while Alexis Petridis of The Guardian described it as "challenging and intriguing", and Luke Saunders of Happy Mag described it as a change of "theatric transcendency", when compared to her previous releases.

In 2019, British producer Mark Ronson featured Olsen on his fifth studio album Late Night Feelings, which also featured Miley Cyrus and Camila Cabello.

On August 28, 2020, Olsen released her fifth studio album Whole New Mess through Jagjaguwar. The album features tracks from All Mirrors arranged in a more intimate style.

On March 30, 2021, Olsen announced a special edition box set titled Songs of the Lark and Other Far Memories, which contains her previous two studio albums All Mirrors and Whole New Mess alongside demos, re-workings, remixes and covers to close this chapter of her career, released via Jagjaguwar. It was announced with the lead single "It's Every Season [Whole New Mess]" and is due for release on May 7, 2021. In 2020, Olsen released several remixes of popular releases. On April 9, 2020, Olsen released a remix of "All Mirrors" from her studio album All Mirrors Produced by Chromatics' Johnny Jewel. On June 3, 2020, Olsen released a remix of "New Love Cassette" from her studio album All Mirrors produced by Mark Ronson with whom she collaborated with on Ronson's song "True Blue".

In 2020, Olsen worked on a cover of "Mr. Lonely", originally by Bobby Vinton, for the film Kajillionaire directed by Miranda July. Olsen collaborated with film composer Emile Mosseri on the cover which was released on September 16, 2020, and was included in the soundtrack. On May 20, 2021, Olsen released a single with Sharon Van Etten, "Like I Used To", which was produced by John Congleton. Olsen and Van Etten appear in the music video with their hair styled in similar shag haircuts.

2021–present: Aisles and Big Time
On August 20, 2021, Olsen released her fourth extended play, Aisles, consisting of five cover versions of popular songs from the 1980s. Pitchfork writer Evan Rytlewski described it as "an unusual departure for a songwriter who's always staked everything on her conviction".

In 2021 she also received the Libera Awards as Best Folk/Bluegrass Record 2021 for her album Whole New Mess (Jagjaguwar) by the American Association of Independent Music (A2IM).

Olsen's sixth studio album, Big Time, was released on June 3, 2022.  The album was preceded by the lead single "All the Good Times", and followed by a second single, the title track "Big Time".

Style
Pitchfork has likened her to acts such as the Cure, Cocteau Twins and Siouxsie and the Banshees, saying that she has created a dark dream-pop dealing with anxiety. Olsen plays a vintage Gibson S-1 guitar from 1979.

Personal life
On April 16, 2021, Olsen came out as gay. In 2022 Olsen revealed that her relationship with partner Adele Thibodeaux had ended, and that she had dated long-time friend and musician Meg Duffy for a few months in 2020. She lives in Asheville, North Carolina.

Discography

Studio albums 
 Half Way Home (2012)
 Burn Your Fire for No Witness (2014)
 My Woman (2016)
 All Mirrors (2019)
 Whole New Mess (2020)
 Big Time (2022)

Awards and nominations

References

External links

 
 
 
 

1987 births
Living people
Musicians from St. Louis
American women singer-songwriters
American indie pop musicians
Feminist musicians
American lesbian musicians
American LGBT songwriters
LGBT people from Missouri
American LGBT singers
Lesbian singers
Singer-songwriters from Missouri
Jagjaguwar artists
Lesbian songwriters
Guitarists from Missouri
21st-century American women singers
21st-century American singers
21st-century American women guitarists
21st-century American guitarists
20th-century American LGBT people
21st-century American LGBT people
American lesbian writers